Saint Landry or Landericus of Paris was a bishop of Paris and is recognized as a saint by the Roman Catholic Church. Landry built a hospital dedicated to St. Christopher, which later became the Hôtel-Dieu de Paris. His feast day is 10 June.

Life
Landry was chief clerk of the Royal Chancery. In 650, he succeeded Audobertus as Bishop of Paris. During the famine of 650-51, Bishop Landry sold all of his personal possessions, as well as some of the furniture and sacred vessels of the church, to feed the poor.

He is credited with building the first major hospital in the city, dedicating it to Saint Christopher, (now the Hôtel-Dieu). 

In 653, Landry, with 23 other bishops, subscribed to the charter Clovis II gave to Saint-Denis Abbey, exempting it from episcopal jurisdiction. It is believed that he built the original church of Saint-Germain l'Auxerrois, which became the parish church of the kings of France.

He died in 661.

Veneration

He was buried at the Church of Saint-Germain-l'Auxerrois, where there is a chapel named after him and most of his relics are kept, except for two bones that were given to the parish of Saint-Landry in 1408, which was originally a chapel near the saint’s house in which he was accustomed to pray. He is honored with an office in the new Paris Breviary.

His feast day is 10 June.

Miracles were recorded of him.  One of them reads:

St. Landry Catholic Church, in Opelousas, Louisiana is dedicated to Landry of Paris. A statue of Saint Landry stands behind the altar, and a stained glass window with his image at the southwest corner of the church.  The civil parish of St. Landry, located in south Louisiana, is named after the church. 

Port St-Landry was Paris' first dock.

References

External links
 Saints of the Day, June 10: Landericus (Landry) of Paris at SaintPatrickDC.org

660s deaths
Bishops of Paris
7th-century Frankish bishops
7th-century Frankish saints
Year of birth unknown